The Patrick Calhoun Family Cemetery, located in Abbeville County, South Carolina, contains the graves of Patrick Calhoun and members of his family, who settled in Abbeville County in the 1750s. While Patrick achieved some fame as an Indian fighter, and later, as a South Carolina politician, he is perhaps best remembered as the father of John C. Calhoun, United States Senator and Vice President of the United States from 1824–1832. There are over two dozen graves in this rural and quiet cemetery. The landmark was listed in the National Historic Register on August 28, 1975.

References

External links
 

Cemeteries on the National Register of Historic Places in South Carolina
1844 establishments in South Carolina
Buildings and structures in Abbeville County, South Carolina
National Register of Historic Places in Abbeville County, South Carolina
Calhoun family